Mordellistena semilikiana is a species of beetle in the genus Mordellistena of the family Mordellidae. It was described by Franciscolo in 1959.

References

Beetles described in 1959
semilikiana